Imbe (伊部町), or Inbe, is a township in the Bizen, Okayama prefecture in western Japan. It is known for the traditional production of Bizen ware. 

The public transportation hub is Imbe Station on the Akō Line.

External links 

 https://web.archive.org/web/20161030093557/http://www.inbe-info.com/

Dissolved municipalities of Okayama Prefecture
Bizen, Okayama